The braille alphabet used for the Kazakh language is based on Russian Braille, with several additional letters found in the print Kazakh alphabet.

Alphabet 
Kazakh uses all of the letters of the Russian alphabet, though some just in loans and has the additional letters ә, ғ, қ, ң, һ, ө, ұ, ү, і.

Apart from  і, which once existed in Russian Braille and  ұ, which is the same as the ў of Belarusian Braille (a letter which was used in earlier Kazakh alphabets with the same value), the braille values assigned to the extra Kazakh letters do not follow the assignments of other languages that use the Cyrillic script in print. They also do not follow international norms, apart from  ә (Latin ä).

Punctuation

Single punctuation:

Paired punctuation:

Kazakh Braille is reported to use the Russian arithmetical parentheses  ... .

Formatting

See also 
 Languages of Kazakhstan
 Kazakh alphabets#Correspondence chart, for the braille alphabet aligned with the Cyrillic

References

 UNESCO (2013) World Braille Usage, 3rd edition.

French-ordered braille alphabets
Kazakh language